Ricardo Cirera Salse (Os de Balaguer, 1864-Barcelona, August 1932) was a geomagnetist who conducted the first geomagnetic survey of the Philippines and who founded the El Ebro Observatory in Roquetes (1904), Catalonia, Spain.  He was also involved in the founding of the scientific journal Ibérica.

See also
Scientific journal

External links
 Web of the Ebro Observatory (available in English)

1932 deaths
Spanish geologists
1864 births
Place of birth missing